Warrior of Rome II is a real-time strategy video game developed by Micronet and published by Bignet in 1992 for the Sega Mega Drive/Genesis as a sequel to Warrior of Rome.

Plot
In Warrior of Rome II, the player is Julius Caesar, commanding the armies of Rome to suppress rebellions in Asia.

Gameplay
The game features a three-quarters overhead perspective view, although the two-player mode features a split-screen view. The game is played in real-time, though movement speed can be adjusted according to difficulty level. There are 15 increasingly difficult stages, and players can play either a single stage or play through the whole 15-stage campaign.

Reception
The game was reviewed in 1993 in Dragon #189 by Hartley, Patricia, and Kirk Lesser in "The Role of Computers" column. The reviewers gave the game 4 out of 5 stars.

References

External links
Warrior of Rome II at IGN
Warrior of Rome II at GameFAQs
Warrior of Rome II at GameSpy

1992 video games
Depictions of Julius Caesar in video games
Micronet co., Ltd. games
Sega Genesis games
Sega Genesis-only games
Single-player video games
Video game sequels
Video games developed in Japan
Video games set in Asia
Warrior of Rome series